Khayitjon Alimova (born 9 January 1992) is an Uzbekistani Paralympic judoka. She represented Uzbekistan at the 2016 Summer Paralympics held in Rio de Janeiro, Brazil and she won the silver medal in the women's +70 kg event.

References

External links 
 

1992 births
Living people
Uzbekistani female judoka
Paralympic judoka of Uzbekistan
Paralympic silver medalists for Uzbekistan
Paralympic medalists in judo
Judoka at the 2016 Summer Paralympics
Medalists at the 2016 Summer Paralympics
Place of birth missing (living people)
21st-century Uzbekistani women